Max Vernon Mathews (November 13, 1926 in Columbus, Nebraska, US – April 21, 2011 in San Francisco, CA, US) was an American pioneer of computer music.

Biography
 Mathews studied electrical engineering at the California Institute of Technology and the Massachusetts Institute of Technology, receiving a Sc.D. in 1954. Working at Bell Labs, Mathews wrote MUSIC, the first widely used program for sound generation, in 1957. For the rest of the century, he continued as a leader in digital audio research, synthesis, and human-computer interaction as it pertains to music performance. In 1968, Mathews and L. Rosler developed Graphic 1, an interactive graphical sound system on which one could draw figures using a light-pen that would be converted into sound, simplifying the process of composing computer generated music.  Also in 1970, Mathews and F. R. Moore developed the GROOVE (Generated Real-time Output Operations on Voltage-controlled Equipment) system, a first fully developed music synthesis system for interactive composition and realtime performance, using 3C/Honeywell DDP-24 (or DDP-224) minicomputers. It used a CRT display to simplify the management of music synthesis in realtime, 12bit D/A for realtime sound playback, an interface for analog devices, and even several controllers including a musical keyboard, knobs, and rotating joysticks to capture realtime performance.

Although MUSIC was not the first attempt to generate sound with a computer (an Australian CSIRAC computer played tunes as early as 1951), Mathews fathered generations of digital music tools. He described his work in parental terms, in the following excerpt from "Horizons in Computer Music", March 8–9, 1997, Indiana University:

In 1961, Mathews arranged the accompaniment of the song "Daisy Bell" for an uncanny performance by computer-synthesized human voice, using technology developed by John Kelly, Carol Lochbaum, Joan Miller and Lou Gerstman of Bell Laboratories. Author Arthur C. Clarke was coincidentally visiting friend and colleague John Pierce at the Bell Labs Murray Hill facility at the time of this remarkable speech synthesis demonstration and was so impressed that he later told Stanley Kubrick to use it in 2001: A Space Odyssey, in the climactic scene where the HAL 9000 computer sings while his cognitive functions are disabled.

Mathews directed the Acoustical and Behavioral Research Center at Bell Laboratories from 1962 to 1985, which carried out research in speech communication, visual communication, human memory and learning, programmed instruction, analysis of subjective opinions, physical acoustics, and industrial robotics. From 1974 to 1980 he was the Scientific Advisor to the Institute de Recherche et Coordination Acoustique/Musique (IRCAM), Paris, France, and since 1987 has been Professor of Music (Research) at Stanford University. He served as the Master of Ceremonies for the concert program of NIME-01, the inaugural conference on New interfaces for musical expression.

Mathews was a member of the National Academy of Sciences, the National Academy of Engineering and a fellow in the American Academy of Arts and Sciences, the Acoustical Society of America, the IEEE, and the Audio Engineering Society. He received a Silver Medal in Musical Acoustics from the Acoustical Society of America, and the Chevalier de l'ordre des Arts et Lettres, République Française.

The Max portion of the software package Max/MSP is named after him (the MSP portion is named for Miller Puckette, who teaches at UC San Diego).

Mathews died on the morning of 21 April 2011 in San Francisco, California of complications from pneumonia. He was 84. He was survived by his wife, Marjorie, his three sons and six grandchildren.

See also
 Qwartz Electronic Music Awards
 Algorithmic composition
 Graphical sound

References

External links

 the GROOVE System on '120 Years Of Electronic Music'
The Digital Computer as a Musical Instrument; Science, Volume 142, Issue 3592, pp. 553–557 1963–11
 Max Mathews at cSounds.com
 Max Mathews received the Qwartz d'Honneur – 2008
 Max Matthews 1926–2011 on Stretta blog
 Max Mathews 1926–2011 by Geeta Dayal, Frieze Magazine, May 9, 2011
 Max Mathews, Computer Music Pioneer, R.I.P.
 Max Mathews interview in Computer Music Journal by Tae Hong Park
 The GROOVE System
Max Mathews Interview for the NAMM (National Association of Music Merchants) Oral History Program March 29, 2007

1926 births
Members of the United States National Academy of Sciences
2011 deaths
American electrical engineers
Fellow Members of the IEEE
Scientists at Bell Labs
Members of the United States National Academy of Engineering
Chevaliers of the Ordre des Arts et des Lettres
California Institute of Technology alumni
People from Columbus, Nebraska
Articles containing video clips